Ecsenius prooculis is a species of combtooth blenny in the genus Ecsenius. It is found in coral reefs in the western Pacific ocean, around Papua New Guinea and the Solomon Islands. It can reach a maximum length of 3.7 centimetres. Blennies in this species feed primarily off of plants, including benthic algae and weeds.

References
 Chapman, W. M.  and L. P. Schultz  1952 (24 Apr.) Review of the fishes of the blennioid genus Ecsenius, with descriptions of five new species. Proceedings of the United States National Museum v. 102 (3310): 507–528.

prooculis
Fish described in 1952